The Dhamnar Caves are caves located in the village of Dhamnar, located in Mandsaur district in the state of Madhya Pradesh, India. This rock cut site consists of 51 caves, stupas, Chaityas, passages, and compact dwellings, carved in the 7th century CE. The site includes large statues of Gautama Buddha in sitting and Nirvana mudra.

Fourteen caves on the northern side are considered historically significant, among which Bari Kacheri (big courthouse) and Bhima Bazar are the most so. The Bari Kacheri cave measures 20 feet square and includes stupas and chaityas. The porch includes stone railing with the wooden architecture. Bhima Bazar cave is the largest among the group, measuring 115 feet by 80 and including vzhara and chaityagruha. It consists of stupas. The roof is in poor condition with the support of wooden architecture.

Architecture 
The Dhamnar caves include 51 rock cut caves containing Buddhist and Hindu structures like stupas, chaityas, porch and small chambers both of Hinayana and Mahayana sects of Buddhism constructed around 5th-6th centuries AD.

This structure includes colossal seating figure of Buddha and it also includes Brahminical rock cut caves (7th-8th century AD) and a single monolithic temple dedicated to Lord Vishnu (8th-9th century AD).

The structure was crumbling before its restoration by Archeological Survey of India mainly because of being constructed by porous laterite rocks which got weathered badly over the centuries, destabilizing and weakening the structure.

Gallery

See also 
Dharmrajeshwar

Further reading

Citations

Buddhist monasteries in India
Buddhist caves in India
Caves of Madhya Pradesh
Tourist attractions in Mandsaur district
Indian rock-cut architecture
Colossal Buddha statues
Former populated places in India
Buddhist pilgrimage sites in India
Architecture in India
Caves containing pictograms in India